Daniconematidae is a family of nematodes belonging to the order Rhabditida.

Genera:
 Daniconema Moravec & Køie, 1987
 Mexiconema Moravec, Vidal & Salgado Maldonado, 1992

References

Nematodes